Only You is a 2005 South Korean television series starring Han Chae-young, Jo Hyun-jae, Lee Chun-hee and Hong Soo-hyun. It is produced and broadcast by SBS from 4 June to 24 July 2005 for 16 episodes.

It is the only Korean drama shot in Italy. The city in which has been shot the drama in Italy was Vicenza, which is located in the north East part, between Venice and Verona (about 50 km distant from Venice).

Plot
Eun Jae (Han Chae-young) is a very stubborn and proud 20-year-old girl who has a passion for cooking. Because she does not have an interest in studying, she runs away to Vicenza in Italy before she graduates from high school to enroll in a cooking school. Her high school friend, who loves her dearly and shares her passion for cooking, comes along with her.

Han Yi-joon (Jo Hyun-jae) is from a wealthy family who owns a large hotel and various restaurants. He travels to Italy in search of his mother that abandoned his family when he was young and there he runs into Eun Jae. Coincidentally, Eun Jae had also been seeking the mother, who happens to be a chef in Vicenza, to learn the secrets to making great pasta. Both chance upon the mother just as she was about to get remarried to an Italian. She comforts Yi-Joon, who is distraught over his mother's remarriage, and they spend the night together. She ends up pregnant and has to give up her dream – but does not tell Yi-Joon.

Six years later, they have all returned to live in South Korea – Eun Jae working low paying cooking jobs, Yi-Joon taking over the operations of his family's restaurant, and Eun Jae's friend working as a chef for one of the restaurants owned by Yi-Joon and financially supporting Eun Jae's family, including the child born out of wedlock, because they have fallen on hard times. Yi-Joon still has feelings for Eun Jae and they run into each other just as he is looking for a new chef for his restaurant-with her in mind. Soon Hyeon who is a family friend of Yi-joon is in love with him and tries to confess her feelings to him

Cast

Han Chae-young as Cha Eun-jae
Jo Hyun-jae as Han Yi-joon
Lee Chun-hee as Jung Hyun-sung
Hong Soo-hyun as Ji Soon-yeon
 Lee Byung-joon as Cha Jin-sol
 Jung Won-joong as Cha Sung-taek
 Song Ok-sook as Park Mi-jung 
 Jeon Hye-bin as Cha Soo-jae
 Jung Wook as Han Seung-ryeol
 Jung Ae-ri as Yoon Hee-jin
 Lee Ah-hyun as Han Yi-kyung

List of episodes

Episode 1
Hyun Sung and Eun Jae win the Noodle King cooking contest. Her mother is not impressed with her cooking ambitions and enrolls her in a boarding school. Hyun Sung and Eun Jae run away to Italy to study cooking. To pass the final exam, she wants to learn a pasta recipe from a South Korean woman in Italy. She bumps into Yi Joon who is there looking for his mother. By coincidence, they discover they are looking for the same person and begrudgingly help each other to locate her.

Episode 2
They find Yi Joon's mother just before she gets married. She does not tell Yi Joon that she recognises him but teaches Eun Jae the pepper pasta recipe. Eun Jae and Yi Joon sleep together. In the morning when Eun Jae is out, Hyun Sung enters the apartment, getting into a fight with Yi Joon. Yi Joon leaves thinking Hyun Sung is Eun Jae's boyfriend. Six years passes, Eun Jae is a single mother to Jin Sol. She had a job in a restaurant as a busboy. Yi Joon unknowingly tasted her pasta when the restaurant's chef accidentally stepped on a spilled cooking oil and fell. Eun Jae cooks the food for Yi Joon without permission from the manager.

Episode 3
Yi Joon starts his plan to improve a restaurant as a test from his father. Eun Jae begins a new job serving snacks in a bar and accidentally meets Yi Joon again. Eun Jae is offered a job at Yi Joon's restaurant.

Episode 4
Eun Jae takes the job at Yi Joon's restaurant. Hyun Sung is pulled from his regular restaurant to train her. Eun Jae's first task is to develop a new menu. Although her first few dishes are nothing spectacular, her special roast chicken impresses. An open tasting is organised to gauge public reaction.

Episode 5
Yi Joon looks through Eun Jae's purse and discovers a photo of her and Jin Sol. There's an open tasting at the restaurant and Eun Jae's family unknowingly turn up. Believing her family is biased in the evaluation, the results are declared invalid. Eun Jae is given one more chance to impress a critic. She and Yi Joon search the countryside for a special garlic. Yi Joon finally asked Eun Jae out.

Episode 6
An unexpected visit by Jin Sol and Eun Jae's sister to Hyun Sung's workplace leads Soon Yeon to discover that Eun Jae is a single mother. A food critic turns up to try out Eun Jae's cuisine. Seeing the critic has a cold, she abandons her initial dishes and makes hot soup for the critic. The critic although touched with the thought, says he can not give a good review as he did not taste the real food of the establishment.

Episode 7
Yi Joon gets mad at Eun Jae on discovering she's a single mother. She leaves the restaurant and helps out at a canteen on a construction site. Eun Jae's parents instruct Hyun Sung on how to attract Eun Jae. Yi Joon asks Eun Jae if he is the father, but Eun Jae denies it. Yi Joon convinces Eun Jae to cook for the chairman. The chairman is impressed and names Eun Jae as head chef for that franchise, however she does not return to take the position.=)

Episode 8
Yi Joon finally confesses that he's in love with Eun Jae. Eun Jae returns to work at the canteen near the construction site. After Yi Joon pesters her daily at the canteen, she agrees to return. A brand new kitchen is set up for Eun Jae to try new recipes.

Episode 9
Hyun Sung and Soon Yeon confront Yi Joon and Eun Jae. Eun Jae's parents still hope that she and Hyun Sung will get together. A promotional photo show Yi Joon and Eun Jae close together. Yi Joon purchases an apartment for Eun Jae's family and tries to persuade her to move out of Hyun Sung's house.

Episode 10
After Eun Jae tells Hyun Sung that they will not be together, Hyun Sung drowns his sorrows in bottles of alcohol. Yi Joon forgets Soon Yeon's birthday and breaks her heart. Eun Jae refuses to have the restaurant's food taken for a television show after she finds out that colouring is added. This ruins the chance to boost the restaurant's popularity. Soon Yeon discovers that Jin Sol is Yin Joon's son.

Episode 11
Yi Joon's father discovers Eun Jae is a single mother. Yi Joon asks her to tell everyone that he is father without knowing that he really is the father. Eun Jae takes Jin Sol to have day out with Yi Joon. Jin Sol sees Hyun Sung as his paternal influence and gets Yi Joon jealous. Eun Jae's family moves out to a smaller apartment.

Episode 12
Eun Jae is about to tell Yi Joon that Jin Sol is his son. Yi Joon is angry that this information was hidden from him. Yi Joon has a change of heart and wants to take a larger role as Jin Sol's father. Eun Jae's father asks Yi Joon to provide him with an expensive shop contract. Soon Yeon approaches Yi Joon's father seeking to marry Yi Joon. In a bar, Soon Yeon and Hyun Sung drink their sorrows away with the knowledge that neither may actually be happy in their current situation.

Episode 13
A leaked company announcement reveals that Eun Jae and Yi Joon are dating. Eun Jae's mother finds out that her hushand accepted an expensive store contract from Yi Joon and makes him give it back. Yi Joon proposes to Eun Jae stating that although he doesn't have a ring, Jin Sol represents a ring for them. Yi Joon's father, in an effort to separate the two, issues a letter stating that he will contest custody of Eun Jae's son.

Episode 14
Eun Jae begins working as an assistant in a TV cooking show. The chef is especially cruel to Eun Jae. Yi Joon and Eun Jae decide to go their separate ways, with Yi Joon agreeing to marry Soon Yeon. A party is held to formally introduce Yi Joon and Soon Yeon as engaged.

Episode 15
Yi Joon cancels his engagement and runs into Eun Jae. Eun Jae gets mad at him fearing that Yi Joon's father will start a custody battle to take Jin Sol away from her. At the television studio where Eun Jae works, she accidentally comes across a secret South Korean sauce from the chef there. Yi Joon's father approaches Eun Jae with an offer to leave. The episode ends with Yi Joon finally tells Jin Sol that he is his father.

Episode 16
Eun Jae has to prepare an Italian-South Korean fusion dish to save the restaurant. She perfects a secret sauce from a South Korean chef and prepares a great dish. With the restaurant saved, she contemplates leaving to another country but comes to realization that she cannot leave Jin Sol without a father. Soon Yeon finally gets over Yi Joon and decides to expand her education in Japan. Hyun Sung quits as chef of his franchise and is able to let go of Eun Jae. Eun Jae and Yi Joon gets married and returns to Italy to visit his mother. Yi Joon's father donates his money to charity and spends his time assisting in Yi Joon's restaurant. They all live happily ever after with Jin Sol.

Adaptation

In 2009, ABS-CBN produced a Philippine remake based on Only You. The adaptation was originally aired from 27 April to 21 August 2009.

References

External links
 

Seoul Broadcasting System television dramas
Korean-language television shows
2005 South Korean television series debuts
2005 South Korean television series endings
South Korean cooking television series
South Korean romantic comedy television series
Television shows set in Venice
Television shows set in Seoul